Corvallis is a city and the county seat of Benton County in central western Oregon, United States. It is the principal city of the Corvallis, Oregon Metropolitan Statistical Area, which encompasses all of Benton County.  As of the 2020 United States Census, the population was 59,922. Corvallis is the location of Oregon State University and Good Samaritan Regional Medical Center. Corvallis is the westernmost city in the contiguous 48 states with a population larger than 50,000.

History

Establishment
In October 1845, Joseph C. Avery arrived in Oregon from the east. Avery took out a land claim at the mouth of Marys River, where it flows into the Willamette River, and in June 1846 took up residence there in a log cabin hastily constructed to hold what seemed a potentially lucrative claim. Avery's primitive 1846 dwelling was the first home within the boundaries of today's Corvallis and his land claim included the southern section of the contemporary city.

Avery was quickly joined by other settlers along the banks of the Willamette River, including a  claim directly to his north taken in September 1846 by William F. Dixon. The discovery of gold in California in 1848 temporarily stalled development of a township, with Avery leaving his Oregon claim to try his hand at mining in the fall of that year. His stay proved to be brief, and in January 1849, Avery returned to Oregon with a small stock of provisions with a view to opening a store.

During 1849, Avery opened his store at the site, platted the land, and surveyed a town site on his land claim, naming the community Marysville. The city was possibly named after early settler Mary Lloyd, but now the name is thought to be derived from French fur trappers' naming of Marys Peak after the Virgin Mary.

In the summer of 1851, Joseph Avery and William Dixon each granted back-to-back  land parcels from their land holdings for the establishment of a county seat. Avery's holding lay to the south and Dixon's to the north, with the Benton County Courthouse marking the approximate line of demarcation between these two land parcels.

Name change

In December 1853 the 5th Oregon Territorial Legislature met in Salem, where a petition was presented seeking to change the name of that city to either "Thurston" or "Valena". At the same time, another petition was presented seeking to change the name of Salem to "Corvallis", from the Latin meaning "heart of the valley", while a third resolution was presented to the upper house seeking to change the name of Marysville to Corvallis.

A heated debate followed, with the name ultimately awarded to Corvallis in an act passed on December 20 of that same year. By way of rationale,  the name "Marysville" was successfully argued to duplicate the moniker of a town in California, located on the same stagecoach route and that a name change was thus necessary to avoid confusion.

Incorporation

A faction within the deeply divided legislature sought to make Corvallis the capital of the Oregon Territory, and in December 1855 the 6th Territorial Legislature initially convened there before returning to Salem later that month—the town which would eventually be selected as the permanent seat of state government.

Corvallis was incorporated as a city on January 29, 1857.

19th-century growth

Corvallis had a three-year boom beginning in 1889, which began with the establishment of a privately owned electrical plant by L.L. Hurd. A flurry of publicity and public and private investment followed, including construction of a grand county courthouse, planning and first construction of a new street railway, construction of a new flour mill along the river between Monroe and Jackson Avenues, and construction of the Hotel Corvallis, today known as the Julian Hotel.

In addition, a carriage factory was launched in the city and the town's streets were improved, while the size of the city was twice enlarged through annexation. Bonds were issued for a city-owned water works, a sewer system, and for public ownership of the electric plant. A publicity campaign was launched to attempt to expand the tax base through new construction for new arrivals. This effort proved mostly unsuccessful, however, and in 1892, normality returned, with the city saddled with about $150,000 in bonded debt.

Geography

Corvallis is at river mile 131–32 of the Willamette River. Corvallis is bordered on the northwest by the foothills of the Oregon Coast Range, with Bald Hill providing a view of the town.

Climate
Like the rest of the Willamette Valley, Corvallis lies in the Marine West Coast climate zone, with Mediterranean characteristics. Under the Köppen climate classification scheme, Corvallis has a warm-summer Mediterranean climate (Köppen: Csb). Temperatures are mild year round, with warm, dry, sunny summers and mild, wet winters with persistently overcast skies. Spring and fall are also moist seasons with varied cloudiness, and light rain falling for extended periods.

Winter snow is rare, but occasionally does fall, and amounts can range between a dusting and a few inches that do not persist on the ground for more than a day. The northwest hills will often experience more snow. During the midwinter months after extended periods of rain, thick, persistent fogs can form, sometimes lasting the entire day. The fog often persists until a new storm system enters the area. This fog could be seen as a type of tule fog.

Rainfall totals within the town itself are surprisingly variable, due to Corvallis lying right on the eastern edge of the Oregon Coast Range, with a small portion of the town inside of the range.

Because of its close proximity to the coastal range, Corvallis can experience slightly cooler temperatures, particularly in the hills, than the rest of the Willamette Valley. Despite this, temperatures dropping far below freezing are still a rare event.

Demographics

Corvallis is the largest principal city of the Albany-Corvallis-Lebanon CSA, a Combined Statistical Area that includes the Corvallis metropolitan area (Benton County) and the Albany-Lebanon micropolitan area (Linn County), which had a combined population of 202,251 at the 2010 U.S. Census.

As of the 2000 U.S. Census the median income for a household in the city was $35,437, and the median income for a family was $53,208. Males had a median income of $40,770 versus $29,390 for females. The per capita income for the city was $19,317. About 9.7% of families and 20.6% of the population were below the poverty line, including 15.2% of those under age 18 and 6.0% of those age 65 or over.

2010 census
As of the 2010 U.S. Census, there were 54,462 people, 22,283 households, and 10,240 families residing in the city. The population density was 4004.5 people per square mile (1,547.2/km2). There were 23,423 housing units at an average density of 1,722.3 per square mile (665.4/km2). The racial makeup of the city was 83.8% White, 7.3% Asian, 1.1% Black or African American, 0.69% Native American, 0.33% Hawaiian or Pacific Islander, 2.8% from other races, and 4.0% from two or more races. 7.4% of the population were Hispanic or Latino of any race.

There were 22,283 households, of which 20.7% had children under the age of 18 living with them, 35.3% were married couples living together, 7.0% had a female householder with no husband present, and 54.0% were non-families. 33.2% of all households were made up of individuals, and 8.9% had someone living alone who was 65 years of age or older. The average household size was 2.22 and the average family size was 2.82.

In the city, the population was spread out, with 14.9% under the age of 18, 32.4% from 18 to 24, 22.9% from 25 to 44, 19.3% from 45 to 64, and 10.5% who were 65 years of age or older. The median age was 26.4 years. For every 100 males there were 98.7 females.

Religion
In 1903, Franz Edmund Creffield, commonly known as Edmund Creffield (circa 1870–1906), a German-American religious leader who called himself Joshua, founded a movement in Corvallis which became known locally as the "Holy Rollers".

Corvallis lies in the middle of the Unchurched Belt. A 2003 study, released once every 10 years, listed Benton County (of which Corvallis makes up the majority of the population) as the least religious county per capita in the United States.  Only one in four people indicated that they were affiliated with one of the 149 religious groups the study identified. The study indicated that some of the disparity, however, may be attributed to the popularity of less common religions (ones not included as an option in the study) in the Pacific Northwest.

Economy
The campus of Oregon State University, which is the major local employer, is located near the edge of the main downtown area. Other major employers include Samaritan Health Services, SIGA Technologies, Evanite Fiber, ONAMI, and HP Inc., which has a large printing research and development operation in the northeast area of town. Because of this relative concentration of employment and the need for diversity, the city launched a website to attract creative industry to the region by branding it with the slogan "Yes Corvallis".
The National Clonal Germplasm Repository at Corvallis is a gene bank of the United States Department of Agriculture Agricultural Research Service. The gene bank preserves temperate fruit, nut, and agronomic crops from around the world.

Corvallis was ranked number 48 on the 100 best places in the US to live and launch a business by Fortune Small Business 2008. This places Corvallis as the second-best place in Oregon to launch a business, after Portland (number 6). Bend (number 87) and Eugene (number 96) were other Oregon localities ranked in the top 100.

Arts and culture

Annual cultural events

 Da Vinci Days festival and kinetic sculpture race
 Corvallis Fall Festival Annual Arts Party in Central Park  was founded in 1972, with the 39th occurrence in 2011.

Museums and other points of interest
 Benton County Courthouse
 Hesthavn Nature Center of the Audubon Society of Corvallis
 McDonald State Forest
 Peavy Arboretum
 Corvallis-Benton County Public Library
 Corvallis Farmers' Market
 Vineyard Mountain

Art galleries
 The Arts Center
 Giustina and Murdock Galleries
 Fairbanks Gallery

Music
Corvallis is home to the Corvallis-OSU Symphony, which celebrated its centennial in 2005. According to the OSU College of Liberal Arts website (as of 2022) the symphony is the oldest continuously operating orchestra in the state of Oregon.

Other musical organizations include:
Corvallis Youth Symphony Association
Chintimini Chamber Music Festival
Chamber Music Corvallis
Corvallis-OSU Piano International
Corvallis Guitar Society
Corvallis Community Band
Willamette Valley Symphony
Heart of the Valley Children's Choir
Hilltop Big Band

Sports
As the home of Oregon State University, Corvallis is the home for 17 NCAA Division I OSU teams (7 men's, 10 women's) in the Pac-12 Conference. Corvallis is also the home of the Corvallis Knights baseball team, who play in the summer at OSU's Goss Stadium. The Knights play in the West Coast League, an independent collegiate summer baseball league with teams from Washington, Oregon, British Columbia and Alberta.

Parks and recreation
Corvallis is recognized as a Tree City USA. The city has at least 47 public parks within and adjacent to the city limits. One such park is Avery Park and Natural Area, which is one of Corvallis' most popular parks. The Avery Park Cross Country Course is located in the park. It is the home course for the Oregon State Beavers cross-country teams. Beazell Memorial Forest, the largest park maintained by Benton County, is located 10 miles from the town.

Parks in Corvallis 

 Willamette Park
 Avery Park
 Wildcat Park
 Timberhill Natural Area
 Central Park
 Cloverland City Park
 Porter Park
 Chintimini Park
 Bald Hill

Witham Hill Natural Area

Government

Helen Berg served as mayor of Corvallis for three terms from 1994 until 2006. Berg was the first female mayor of Corvallis, and the longest-serving mayor of the city to date.  The current mayor is Biff Traber, elected in 2014 and re-elected in 2018.

The City of Corvallis uses the City Council/City Manager form of government with a weak mayor.  The City Council is made of nine city councilors who represent their representative wards and are elected to two-year terms.  The City Manager is appointed by the City Council and serves at the pleasure of the City Council.  The City Manager primary job is to run the administrative day-to-day operations of the City.

The Corvallis Police Department provides law enforcement services to the city.

Education

Education has had a place in Corvallis since the earliest days of the town, with the first school building constructed in 1848 and put to use in 1850.

During the first decade of the 21st century, local boosters claimed that Corvallis had the highest education rate per capita of any city in the state of Oregon.

Public schools in the city are administered by the Corvallis School District, with two acting high schools, Corvallis High School and Crescent Valley. Corvallis is also the home of Oregon State University and the Benton Center campus of Linn-Benton Community College.

Media
 Corvallis Gazette-Times, daily newspaper
 The Corvallis Advocate, free alternative newsweekly
 The Daily Barometer, the Oregon State University campus newspaper

Corvallis is part of the Eugene, Oregon, radio and television market. Portland area TV stations like KATU, KOIN and KGW are also available on select cable providers.

Infrastructure

Transportation
In 2009, the Corvallis metropolitan statistical area (MSA) ranked as the highest in the United States for percentage of commuters who biked to work (9.3%), and the second-highest percentage of commuters who walked to work (11.2%). More than one of five Corvallis commuters traveled to work via some form of active transportation.  In 2013, the Corvallis MSA represented the fifth-lowest mode share for commuting by private automobile (72.6%). During the same period, 8.8% of Corvallis-area commuters biked, another 7.9% walked, and 7.7% worked from home.

Bus

Long-distance bus service is provided in Corvallis by Greyhound. It stops at the Greyhound station in downtown Corvallis (station ID: CVI).

Local bus service is provided by Corvallis Transit System (CTS). The Corvallis City Council approved an additional fee on monthly water utility bills in January 2011, allowing all CTS bus service to become fareless. The system runs a total of eight daytime routes Monday through Saturday, covering most of the city and converging at the Downtown Transit Center. Additional commuter routes run in the early morning and late afternoon on weekdays, and midmorning and midafternoon on Saturdays.  When Oregon State University is in session, CTS also runs the "Night Owl", a set of late-night routes running Thursday through Saturday.

Two other short-distance intercity buses, the Linn-Benton Loop (to Albany) and the Philomath Connection, also stop at the Downtown Transit Center.

From 2010 to 2011, CTS has saw a 37.87% increase in ridership, partially as a result of going fareless and "the rising cost of fuel for individual vehicles and the desire for residents to choose more sustainable options for commuting to work, school and other activities" According to Tim Bates, the Corvallis Transit System and Philomath Connection had 3,621,387 passenger miles traveled and 85,647 gallons of fuel consumed in fiscal year 2011, a period that covers July 1, 2010 - June 30, 2011. This means that riders in 2011 got 42.28 passenger miles per gallon.

In 2019, the local bus system expanded to several more lines throughout the city, and the addition of a minimal Sunday service.

Bicycle
The League of American Bicyclists gave Corvallis a gold rating as a Bicycle-Friendly Community in 2011. Also, according to the United States Census Bureau's 2008–12 American Community Survey, 11.2% of workers in Corvallis bicycle to work.  The city of Corvallis is ranked third-highest among 'small' U.S. cities (with populations under 200,000) for bicycle commuters, behind Key West, Florida (17.4) and Davis, California (18.6).

Air
Corvallis Municipal Airport serves private and corporate aircraft. The closest commercial air service is available at Eugene Airport, or Portland International Airport, .

Bridges
Van Buren Street Bridge
Willamette River Bridge (Highway 34)
Irish Bend Covered Bridge

Utilities

Water

The Rock Creek treatment plant processes water from sources in the  Rock Creek Municipal Watershed near Marys Peak. The three sources are surface streams, which are all tributaries of the Marys River.

The H.D. Taylor treatment plant obtains water from the Willamette River, and has been expanded at least four times since it was first constructed in 1949.

As part of its ongoing water-conservation program, the water department jointly publishes a guide to water-efficient garden plants.

Green power
According to the federal Environmental Protection Agency report on its "green power communities", Corvallis is among the top cities in the nation in terms of buying electricity produced from renewable resources. Corvallis purchases more than 126 million kilowatt-hours of green power annually, which amounts to 21% of the city's total purchased electricity.

Fire department
The Corvallis Fire Department is headed by Fire Chief Ben Janes as of February 14, 2022 and currently has four stations in the City and 1 station located in the Corvallis Rural Fire Protection District staffed by 1 paid Lieutenant and several Resident Interns. A sixth fire station was shuttered several years ago due to budgeting shortfalls and remains closed to date. Corvallis Fire provides ALS ambulance service for all of Benton County with 5 frontline ambulances. In 2021 CFD ran almost 10,000 calls for service. The Corvallis Professional Firefighters IAFF Local 2240 represents all line personnel and prevention staff.

Notable people

This list excludes persons whose only connection to Corvallis is attendance or employment at Oregon State University.

 Lucia H. Faxon Additon (1847-1919), writer, teacher, social reformer
 Edward Allworth (1895–1966), Medal of Honor recipient
 Debra Arlyn (born 1986), singer-songwriter
 Joseph C. Avery (1817–1876), Marysville town founder and politician
 Brad Badger (born 1975), NFL player
 Brad Bird (born 1957), animator, writer, and director (The Incredibles, The Iron Giant, Ratatouille)
 Kevin Boss (born 1984), NFL tight end, Super Bowl XLII champion with the New York Giants
 Chris Botti (born 1962), jazz trumpet musician
 Meredith Brooks (born 1958), singer, songwriter, producer
 James Cassidy, member of band Information Society
 Robert Cheeke, bodybuilder and vegan activist
 Randy Couture, mixed martial artist and UFC Hall of Fame member
 Edmund Creffield, founder of "Bride of Christ Church", also known as "Holy Rollers"
 Christopher L. Eisgruber, Rhodes Scholar and 20th president of Princeton University
 Atta Elayyan (1985–2019), New Zealand futsal player, murdered in the Christchurch mosque shootings
 Dick Fosbury (1947–), 1968 Olympics gold medalist and innovator of modern back-first method of high jumping
 Bob Gilder (1950–), professional golfer, member of Champions Tour
 Gordon Gilkey (1912–2000), artist and educator
 Kevin Gregg (1978–), MLB player
 Les Gutches (1973–), Olympic wrestler, world champion
 Elizabeth Hoffman, actress
 Talanoa Hufanga, NFL player
 Nick Hundley (1983–), MLB player
 Eyvind Kang, violinist and composer
 Paul Kocher, cryptographer
 Jon Krakauer, author (Into Thin Air, Under the Banner of Heaven, etc.) and mountaineer
 Wayne Krantz, guitarist
 Jane Lubchenco, marine biologist, named in 2009 to head National Oceanic and Atmospheric Administration
 Bernard Malamud, author, writer of The Natural; his book A New Life was based on Corvallis
 Ben Masters (1947–), actor, notable for soap opera Passions, stage and film works
 Ralph Miller (1919–2001), basketball coach, enshrined in Naismith Memorial Basketball Hall of Fame
 Barbara Minty, (also known as Barbara Minty McQueen) Vogue model and wife of late actor Steve McQueen
 Rebecca Morris, broadcast, radio, and print journalist, The New York Times bestselling nonfiction author
 Sara Nelson (1973–), an American union leader who serves as the international president of the Association of Flight Attendants-CWA, AFL–CIO
 Mario Pastega (1916–2012), businessman and philanthropist
 Linus Pauling (1901–1994), 1954 Nobel Prize in Chemistry and 1962 Nobel Peace Prize (graduate of Oregon Agricultural College, now Oregon State)
 Jason Reed, actor, musician
 Harold Reynolds (1960–), MLB player and broadcaster
 Doug Riesenberg (1965–), former NFL offensive tackle
 Mike Riley (1953–), football head coach of Nebraska Cornhuskers, former coach of NFL's San Diego Chargers
 Nathan Sexton, professional disc golfer and winner of the 2017 United States Disc Golf Championship
 Jordan Smotherman, pro hockey player
 Robb Thomas, former NFL player
 Ernest H. Wiegand, professor of horticulture and developer of modern method of manufacture of the maraschino cherry
 Carl Wieman, 2001 Nobel Prize in Physics recipient for creation of Bose–Einstein condensate
 Bushrod Washington Wilson (1828–1900), pioneer, railroad executive, and county functionary
 Mike Zandofsky, former NFL player

Sister cities
Corvallis has two sister cities, as designated by Sister Cities International:
 Gondar, Ethiopia
 Uzhhorod, Zakarpattia Oblast, Ukraine

See also
 Whiteside Theatre

References

Further reading
 Benton County Citizens' League, Benton County, Oregon, illustrated: Published under Direction of the Benton County Citizens' League. n.c.: n.p., 1904.
 Benton County Historical Society and Museum, A Pictorial History of Benton County. Corvallis, OR: Corvallis Gazette-Times, 2000.
 Tim Chandler, Street Politics and Bobby Packwood: A Participant's Memoir of the Corvallis, Oregon, Anti-Packwood Demonstration of January 27, 1993. Corvallis, OR: 1000 Flowers Publishing, 2003.
 Downtown Corvallis Association, "Downtown Corvallis Association Membership Application (1979)," Corvallis, OR: Downtown Corvallis Association, 1979. —Includes short history of origins and purposes.
 David D. Fagan, History of Benton County, Oregon: Including... a Full Political History, ...Incidents of Pioneer Life, and Biographical Sketches of Early and Prominent Citizens... Portland, OR: A.G. Walling, Printer, 1885.
 Oregon State College, Outline History of Oregon State College. Corvallis, OR: Oregon State College, 1950.
 David A Pinyerd, Bernadette Niederer, and Tony Vandermeer, A History of Corvallis High School. Corvallis, OR: Corvallis School District 509J, 2005.
 Minerva Kiger Reynolds, Corvallis in 1900. Corvallis, OR: Minerva Kiger Reynolds, n.d. [1976].
 M. Boyd Wilcox, Two to Four O'clock at The Beanery : A Journal of Observations, Analyses, Interviews, and Commentary Regarding a First-Rate "Third Place" in Downtown Corvallis, Oregon. Corvallis, OR: n.p., 2012.

External links

 City of Corvallis official website
 Entry for Corvallis in the Oregon Blue Book
 Corvallis Convention & Visitors Bureau

 
Cities in Benton County, Oregon
Cities in Oregon
County seats in Oregon
Willamette Valley
Former colonial and territorial capitals in the United States
Populated places established in 1845
1845 establishments in Oregon Country
Populated places on the Willamette River